The Thomas Fork Formation is an Early Cretaceous (Albian) geologic formation in Wyoming. Fossil dinosaur eggs have been reported from the formation.

Fossil content 
The following fossils were reported from the formation:

Vertebrates
 Dinosauria indet.
 Osteichthyes indet.
 Reptilia indet.
 Testudines indet.

Invertebrates
 Bivalves
 Gastropoda indet.

See also 
 List of dinosaur-bearing rock formations
 List of stratigraphic units with dinosaur trace fossils
 Dinosaur eggs

References

Bibliography 

  
 

Geologic formations of Wyoming
Lower Cretaceous Series of North America
Cretaceous geology of Wyoming
Albian Stage
Sandstone formations
Ooliferous formations
Paleontology in Wyoming